Madeiran land snail is a common name which has been given to several different species of terrestrial gastropods, air-breathing land snails:

 Caseolus calculus
 Discula lyelliana, found only on the Desertas Islands in the Madeira Archipelago; critically endangered
 Geomitra grabhami, critically endangered; remnant populations present on Desertas Islands of Madeira
 Geomitra moniziana
 Leiostyla abbreviata, extinct
 Leiostyla cassida
 Leiostyla corneocostata
 Leiostyla gibba, extinct

Animal common name disambiguation pages